Orthology may refer to:
 Orthology (biology) - Homologous sequences originate from the same ancestors (homolog e.g. all globin protein), which are separated from each other after a speciation event, e.g. human beta and chimp beta globin. An orthologous gene is a gene in different species that evolved from a common ancestor by speciation. Normally orthologous genes retain the same function in the course of evolution. 
 Orthology (language) - the study of the correct use of words.